Yan Dhanda (born 14 December 1998) is an English professional footballer who currently plays for Scottish Premiership side Ross County as an attacking midfielder. He is a former England under-17 international.

Early life
Dhanda was born in Birmingham, and grew up in Tipton. His mother is white English while his father was born in England to parents from Punjab, India.

Club career
Dhanda began his youth career at West Bromwich Albion before moving to Liverpool, spending five years in the youth ranks at Anfield. In his final season with the youth team, he scored five times from 18 appearances in the Premier League 2 campaign. In May 2018, he left Liverpool to join Championship club Swansea City where he was originally expected to be with the Under 23s.

Dhanda made his debut as a substitute for Swansea on 4 August 2018 against Sheffield United in a 2–1 win, scoring the winner with his first touch only moments after entering the field.

On 21 June 2022, Dhanda signed a 2 year contract with Highland-based Scottish Premiership team Ross County.

International career
Dhanda has represented the England U16 and England U17's at international level.

Personal life
Dhanda is of Indian heritage through his father. He has said that the racism he has encountered as a British Asian footballer inspires him to play at his best. The most prominent racial abuse that Dhanda received was from a 14 year old child from Kent, who sent a racist message to Dhanda on social media following Swansea City's 2021 FA Cup loss to Manchester City.

Career statistics

References

1998 births
Living people
Footballers from Birmingham, West Midlands
Sportspeople from Tipton
English footballers
England youth international footballers
Association football midfielders
Liverpool F.C. players
Swansea City A.F.C. players
English Football League players
English people of Punjabi descent
British sportspeople of Indian descent
British Asian footballers
Scottish Professional Football League players
Ross County F.C. players